The Lunatic at Large Again is a 1922 comedy novel the British writer J. Storer Clouston. It was the sequel to the 1899 novel The Lunatic at Large and enjoyed commercial success. It portrays the further adventures of Francis Beveridge, and like its predecessor relies on a Wodehousian style of humour.  It was published in America by E.P. Dutton & Company. Elements from the story were used in the 1927 American silent film The Lunatic at Large.

References

Bibliography
 Goble, Alan. The Complete Index to Literary Sources in Film. Walter de Gruyter, 1999.
 Royle, Trevor. Macmillan Companion to Scottish Literature. Macmillan, 1984.

1922 British novels
Novels set in England
British comedy novels
Novels by J. Storer Clouston
Sequel novels